The Toledo Incident of 1925 occurred on July 12, 1925, in Toledo Oregon when residents force out Japanese workers and their families working at the Toledo saw mill. A year later six people responsible for the incident would be found guilty.

Background and incident 
The Pacific Spruce corporation was having a hard time finding reliable workers to do the night shifts on the green chain due to the low pay and the high physical demands it required. Issei workers were brought in to work at the Toledo sawmill on 10 July 1925 in Toledo Oregon to work on the green chain night shifts to address this problem. The Toledo locals were not happy with the idea of bringing in foreign labor.

The twenty-two Japanese workers their two wives and three Japanese American children were forced out along with the four Filipino workers and a Korean worker by a mob of over 200 Toledo residents in 12 July 1925. The workers and their families were transported by the trucks and car by the towns folk to a train station in Corvallis Oregon. Five men were arrest the next day (these men were Charles A. Buck, W.S. Colvin, Harry T. Pritchard, Martin Germer, and James Stewart). The Japanese workers ended up in Portland Oregon.

Trial 
Eight men (Martin H Germer, Charles A Buch, L.D. Emerson, W.S. Colvin, Harry T. Pritchard, Frank Sturdevant, Owen Hart and George R. Schenck) and one women (Rosemary Schenck) were charged with civil rights violations by Tamakichi Ogura who was one of the Pacific Spruce Company workers that was forced out. The trial began on the 12th of July, 1926 under judge Wolverton. Germer, Buch and Emerson disappeared and could not be summoned for the trial. A verdict was reached on July 23, 1926 and found the defendants guilty.

defendants had to $2,500 in damages to Mr. Tamakichi, plus courtroom fees

A settlement was reach on 1 October 1926.

References 

Japanese-American history